{|align="right" rules="all" cellspacing="0" cellpadding="4" style="margin:0 0 1em 1em;border:1px solid #999;border-right-width:2px;border-bottom-width:2px;text-align:left;font-size:10pt"
|colspan="2" style="background:#faf9ec;text-align:center"|Legend
|-
|  || Commercial port
|-
|  || Passengers port
|-
|   || Fishing port''
|-
|  || Nautic base
|}
This is a list of ports and harbours in the Valencian Community of Spain.

Alicante (province)

Ports 

Ports of Alicante/AlacantPort of Alicante    
Port "Costa Blanca" (Alicante) 
Port of "Varadero del Real Club de Regatas" (Alicante) 
Port of Nueva Tabarca (island)    
Ports of AlteaPort of Altea  
Port "La Galera" (Altea) 
Port of L'Olla d'Altea (Altea) 
Port of "Marina Greenwich" (Altea) 
Port of Benidorm 
Port "Les Bassetes" (Benissa) 
Ports of Calp (Calpe)
Port of Calp  
Port "Port Blanco" (Calp)  
Port "La Illeta" (El Campello) 
Ports of DéniaPort of Dénia
Port of "La Marina Dénia" 
Port of Marina of Las Dunas (Guardamar del Segura)   
Ports of Xàbia (Jávea)
Port of Xàbia   
Port of "Nou Fontana" (Jávea) 
Port of Moraira (Teulada)  
Ports of Orihuela'''
Port "Dehesa Campoamor" (Orihuela) 
Port "Cabo Roig" (Orihuela) 
Port "Torre de la Horadada" (Pilar de la Horadada) 
Port of Santa Pola    
Port of Torrevieja 
Port of Villajoyosa

Nautical Clubs

Castellón (province)

Ports 

Port of Benicarló   
Port of Burriana    
Port of Castellón    
Port of "Las Fuentes" (Alcossebre)  
Port of Oropesa 
Port of Peníscola (Peñíscola)   
Port of Vinaròs

Nautical Clubs 

Real Club Náutico de Castellón
Founded in 1933 (Official website)

Valencia (province)

Ports 

Port of Cullera   
Port of Gandia    
Port "La Goleta" (Oliva) 
Port of El Perelló 
Port of La Pobla de Farnals 
Port of "Siles" (Canet de Berenguer) 
Port "Port Saplaya" (Alboraya) 
Port of Valencia    
Port of Sagunto

Nautical Clubs 

Real Club Náutico de Valencia

See also
List of seaports
Harbor
Port

Valencian Community
Ports
 Valencian Community
Spain transport-related lists
Valencian Community